John Zappia is a drag racing competitor from Perth, Western Australia.

John races a Holden HQ 2 door Monaro Top Doorslammer, similar to an American Pro Modified.
John is the current ANDRA Australian "Top Doorslammer" Champion, having won the category a record 10 consecutive times.

John holds the National ANDRA "Top Doorslammer" Elapsed Time (ET) record for this category at 5.693 seconds.

This was achieved during his qualifying run at the 2013 FUCHS Winternationals held at Willowbank Raceway Australia on 9 June 2013. This record was backed up by his 5.753 second run, achieved during qualifying at the same event, the day before (8 June 2013).

He also holds the Australian National IHRA "Pro Slammer" record, at 5.635 seconds. This was recorded at Sydney International Dragway at the 2017 Nitro Champs meeting on 6 May 2017.

His personal best speed is recorded at 256.7 mph (413.1 km/h).

John is the current ANDRA Australian "Top Doorslammer" National Champion, having won the "ANDRA Pro Series" Championship for a record ten years straight in 2007/08, 2008/09, 2009/10, 2010/11, 2011/12, 2012/13, 2013/14, 2014/15, 2015/16, 2016/17.

The 2015/2016 Championship was won in conjunction with winning the inaugural IHRA Australian "Pro Slammer" Championship series, making John the first driver to win both Championship series in the same year.

Personal best
Elapsed Time: 
 ANDRA Australian National "Top Doorslammer" Record:  5.645 seconds
 IHRA Australian National "Pro Slammer" Record:  5.601 seconds
 PDRA Pro Extreme:  5.424 Seconds
 Personal Best: 5.585 260 mph

Championships:
 Ten Consecutive ANDRA "Top Doorslammer" National Championships; 2008 through to 2017
 IHRA "400 Thunder" National Championship 2015/16

External links
 Zappia's Official Website
 Zappia's Official Supplier - Procomp Electronics | Motorsport

Dragster drivers
Living people
Sportsmen from Western Australia
Racing drivers from Perth, Western Australia
Year of birth missing (living people)